Severe Tropical Storm Kammuri, known in the Philippines as Tropical Storm Lagalag, killed hundreds of people in the wake of a deadly flood season in China. The system developed from a large monsoonal system that persisted toward the end of July 2002 near the Philippines. On August 2, a tropical depression formed off the northwest coast of Luzon and moved west-northwestward. Late on August 3, it intensified into Tropical Storm Kammuri off the coast of Hong Kong. A weakening ridge turned the storm northward toward the coast of China. The storm made landfall with late on August 4, after reaching peak winds of 100 km/h (65 mph). The system dissipated over the mountainous coastline of eastern China and merged with a cold front on August 7.

High rainfall from Kammuri affected large portions of China, particularly in Guangdong Province where it moved ashore. In that province, over 100,000 people had to evacuate due to flooding and after 6,810 houses were destroyed. The floods damaged roads, railroads, and tunnels, and left power and water outages across the region. Rainfall was beneficial in alleviating drought conditions in Guangdong, although further inland the rains occurred after months of deadly flooding. In Hunan Province, the storm's remnants merged with a cold front, destroying 12,400 houses. Across its path, the floods damaged or destroyed 245,000 houses and destroyed  of crop fields. Kammuri caused 153 deaths, most of which were related to the remnants, and damage was estimated at $509 million (¥4.219 billion yuan).

Meteorological history

The origins of Kammuri are uncertain; they were possibly related to the monsoon trough that moved across the Philippines toward Guam. In late July, a large area of convection persisted in the Philippine Sea, organizing enough for the Philippine Atmospheric, Geophysical and Astronomical Services Administration (PAGASA) to initiate advisories on Tropical Depression Lagalag on August 1. Around that time, the system had several weak circulations, one of which persisted in the South China Sea; this center was located east of an area of thunderstorms due to moderate wind shear. Early on August 2, the Japan Meteorological Agency (JMA) classified the system as a tropical depression to the north of Luzon. Shortly thereafter, the Joint Typhoon Warning Center (JTWC) followed suit by initiating advisories on Tropical Depression 17W, and the Hong Kong Observatory (HKO) followed suit early on August 3. Initially, it moved generally to the west-northwest, owing to a mid-level ridge over eastern China. The convection became more concentrated, and the JMA upgraded the depression to Tropical Storm Kammuri late on August 3, to the south of Hong Kong.

An upper-level low connected to a trough weakened the ridge over China, allowing Kammuri to move slowly northward. Continued wind shear initially prevented the thunderstorms from being located over the center, although the shear gradually decreased, allowing the convection to organize. Kammuri quickly intensified into a severe tropical storm; the JMA estimated peak 10-minute sustained winds of 100 km/h (65 mph) at 1800 UTC on August 4. The JTWC estimated the storm was weaker, with 1-minute winds of 95 km/h (60 mph). At around 2300 UTC on August 4, Kammuri made landfall east of Hong Kong in Guangdong Province, just east of Shanwei. An approaching mid-latitude storm caused it to accelerate over land. Kammuri quickly weakened to a tropical depression, and the JTWC discontinued advisories at 1200 UTC on August 5. The JMA continued tracking the system until Kammuri dissipated on August 7 over central China. The remnants were absorbed by a cold front.

Preparations, impact, and aftermath

By that time, the outer rainbands had begun affecting the region. Kammuri dropped heavy rainfall in Hong Kong that reached  in the town of Kwai Chung, most of which fell after the storm passed the region. The rains caused one landslide and damaged one road. In nearby Macau, outer rainbands delayed airplane flights, and there was some flooding.

The rains caused flash flooding in the province, which destroyed 6,810 houses, leaving thousands homeless. At Guangzhou Baiyun International Airport, officials delayed or canceled 56 flights because of the storm. Similarly, Shantou Waisha Airport was closed for four hours, which delayed or canceled 10 flights. Heavy damage was reported in three coastal cities. Two small electrical dams were destroyed by the storm, causing additional flooding. Widespread areas lost power or water, and floods damaged or destroyed roads, tunnels, and large areas of crop lands. The storm killed two people by electrocution in Shantou, and a landslide killed 10 people in Wuhua County. Another landslide disrupted rail traffic between the region and Beijing. About 100,000 people had to evacuate their houses in two cities. There were 27 deaths in the province, and damage was estimated at $109 million (¥904 million yuan). After the storm, provincial officials coordinated the rescue effort for missing people. Despite the destruction, the rainfall from Kammuri helped alleviate drought conditions in the province. However, elsewhere in China, the rainfall occurred after months of heavy rainfall had killed 800 people.

Two stations in the city reported the highest daily total on record. Wind gusts reached 79 km/h (49 mph) in Putian, Fujian. Damage in the province totaled $131 million (¥1.085 billion yuan). There were 19 deaths in Fujian. Significant flooding from Kammuri occurred inland, related to the storm's remnants' merging with a cold front. Rainfall reached  at a station in Jiangxi Province. In Hunan Province, the storms destroyed 12,400 houses, leaving over 10,000 people homeless. Also in the province, 14 reservoirs surpassed their capacity. A total of 107 people were killed in Hunan, and damage totaled $322 million (¥2.665 billion yuan).

Across Guangdong, Fujian, and Hunan provinces, floods forced 394,000 people to evacuate, and there were 153 deaths. Overall, 72,000 houses were destroyed and 173,000 sustained damage. In the three provinces, the floods destroyed  and damaged  of crop fields. After the storm, thousands of soldiers in the People's Liberation Army placed sandbags and maintained dykes along Dongting Lake, and, by the end of August, most floods had receded nationwide.

While Kammuri was moving ashore, several ships offshore reported winds of over 74 km/h (40 mph). High rainfall totals spread as far east as Taiwan, where  was reported in Taitung County; this was the station's highest daily total. The remnants of Kammuri spread across South Korea with rainfall.

Notes

References

External links

JMA General Information of Severe Tropical Storm Kammuri (0212) from Digital Typhoon
JMA Best Track Data of Severe Tropical Storm Kammuri (0212) 
JMA Best Track Data (Graphics) of Severe Tropical Storm Kammuri (0212)
JMA Best Track Data (Text)
JTWC Best Track Data of Tropical Storm 16W (Kammuri)
16W.KAMMURI from the U.S. Naval Research Laboratory

2002 Pacific typhoon season
Typhoons in China
Tropical Storm Kammuri
Western Pacific severe tropical storms
Typhoons in Hong Kong
Kammuri